Dendrocorticium is a genus of fungi in the family Punctulariaceae. According to the Dictionary of the Fungi (10th edition, 2008), the widespread genus contains seven species.

Species
, Index Fungorum accepts 10 species of Dendrocorticium:
Dendrocorticium ancistrophylli Boidin & Gilles (1998)
Dendrocorticium crystalliferum Boidin & Gilles (1998)
Dendrocorticium ionides (Bres.) M.J.Larsen & Gilb. (1974)
Dendrocorticium nasti  Boidin & Gilles (1998)
Dendrocorticium ovalisporum  Boidin & Gilles (1998)
Dendrocorticium piceinum  P.A.Lemke (1977)
Dendrocorticium pinsapineum  (G.Moreno, Manjón & Hjortstam) Gorjón & Bernicchia (2010)
Dendrocorticium polygonioides  (P.Karst.) M.J.Larsen & Gilb. (1974)
Dendrocorticium roseolum  (Bres. ex Rick) Baltazar & Rajchenb. (2013)
Dendrocorticium violaceum  H.S. Jacks. (1977)

References

Agaricomycetes genera
Corticiales
Fungi described in 1974